Divlji Anđeli (Serbian Cyrillic: Дивљи Анђели; trans. Wild Angels) was a Yugoslav rock band formed in Belgrade in 1982. Although short-lived, the band enjoyed large mainstream popularity during its existence, mostly thanks to their 1982 hit "Voli te tvoja zver".

History 
The band was formed in 1982 by Dragan Đorđević "Joe" (formerly of the band Tarkus, guitar), Nebojša Savić "Boca" (vocals), Dejan Lalević (bass guitar) and Miroslav Lekić "Šiki" (drums), all strongly influenced by New Romanticism movement. For several weeks, young guitarist Antonije Pušić (who would later start performing under the pseudonym Rambo Amadeus) rehearsed with them, but eventually did not join the band.

Divlji Anđeli released their debut, self-titled album in 1982, without previously having any live performances. The album lyrics were written by Nebojša Savić and lyricist Marina Tucaković, while all the music was composed by Savić. The album was produced by Saša Habić, who also played keyboards on the album recording. The album featured Marina Švabić (of jazz rock band KIM) on backing vocals. It brought the band's only hit, "Voli te tvoja zver" ("Your Beast Loves You").

In 1984, the band, in the new lineup, consisting of Savić on guitar and vocals, Lekić on drums, Radomir Marić on bass guitar and Branko Jirček on keyboards, released the 12" single Totalni kontakt (Total Contact). The single featured two versions of the title track and the song "Otrovna ljubav" ("Poison Love"). It featured Zana Nimani as guest vocalist.

After the release of Totalni kontakt the band ended their activity.

Post breakup
In early 1990s, Radomir Marić joined pop band Divlji Kesten, with which he recorded five studio albums. In late 2000s, he played bass guitar in the heavy metal band Kraljevski Apartman, participating in the recording of the album Igre bez pravila, but leaving the band before the album release.

Legacy
In 2011, the song "Voli te tvoja zver" was voted, by the listeners of Radio 202, one of 60 greatest songs released by PGP-RTB/PGP-RTS during the sixty years of the label's existence.

Discography

Studio albums
Divlji Anđeli (1982)

Singles
Totalni kontakt (12" single, 1984)

References

External links 
 
 Official YouTube channel
 Divlji Anđeli at Discogs

Serbian pop rock music groups
Yugoslav rock music groups
Musical groups from Belgrade
Musical groups established in 1982
Musical groups disestablished in 1984
1982 establishments in Yugoslavia